John Lahart is an Irish Fianna Fáil politician who has been a Teachta Dála (TD) for the Dublin South-West constituency since the 2016 general election.

Early life 

Lahart is from Ballyroan, County Dublin where he was educated at Scoil an Spiorad Naomhin and then by the Christian Brothers at Coláiste Éanna. After training as a teacher at the Mater Dei Institute of Education, he taught at Ballinteer Community School from 1995 to 2000. Lahart also received a master's degree from Mater Dei in 1996.  In 2007, he was awarded a BSc in Counselling and Psychotherapy.

He later lived in Knocklyon, working as a psychotherapist in private practice. He was a member of the Irish Association of Counsellors and Psychotherapists (IACP).

Political career
Lahart joined Fianna Fáil in 1983, after being encouraged by Séamus Brennan TD to get involved in the party.
From 1992 to 1994 and from 2000 to 2007, Lahart was a special adviser to Tom Kitt, the Fianna Fáil TD for Dublin South. He was a member of South Dublin County Council from 1999 to 2016, and served as leader of the Fianna Fáil group on the council.

In October 2014, Lahart was the unsuccessful Fianna Fáil candidate in the Dublin South-West by-election, winning only 8.6% of the first preference votes (FPV). He was seen as having fought a good campaign, and performed well in two televised debates. Lahart described the challenge of getting known in the constituency, and in 2015 Fianna Fáil leader Micheál Martin explained the by-election as part of a medium term plan of building a "platform" for the 2016 general election.

The next general election was held in February 2016, when Lahart topped the poll with 14.3% of the FPV.  He was the first candidate to be elected, on the 11th count, becoming Dublin South-West's first Fianna Fáil TD since the defeat of both Charlie O'Connor and Conor Lenihan at the 2011 general election.  Emma Murphy was co-opted to fill the seat on South Dublin County Council which had been automatically vacated on his election to the Dáil.

In May 2016, he was appointed to the Fianna Fáil Front Bench by the Leader of the Opposition Micheál Martin as Opposition Spokesperson for Dublin, replacing Darragh O'Brien.

At the general election in February 2020, he won 8.1% of the first-preference votes, and was re-elected on the eleventh count, without reaching the quota. In June 2020, Fianna Fáil, Fine Gael and the Green Party negotiated a deal to form a coalition government, and Lahart was tipped as a possible Minister of State. However, he opposed the programme for government, and when the new government was formed, he was not one of the eight Fianna Fáil TDs to be appointed as Minister of State.

In July 2020, during the COVID-19 pandemic, he became the first TD to wear a face mask in the Dáil chamber.

References

External links
John Lahart's page on the Fianna Fáil website

Living people
Members of the 32nd Dáil
Members of the 33rd Dáil
Fianna Fáil TDs
Local councillors in South Dublin (county)
Alumni of Mater Dei Institute of Education
Year of birth missing (living people)
People educated at Coláiste Éanna
People from Rathfarnham